In Greek mythology, Pheme (Greek: , Phēmē; Roman equivalent: Fama), also known as Ossa in Homeric sources, was the personification of fame and renown, her favour being notability, her wrath being scandalous rumours. She was a daughter either of Gaia or of Elpis (Hope), was described as "she who initiates and furthers communication" and had an altar at Athens. A tremendous gossip, Pheme was said to have pried into the affairs of mortals and gods, then repeated what she learned, starting off at first with just a dull whisper, but repeating it louder each time, until everyone knew. In art, she was usually depicted with wings and a trumpet.

In Roman mythology, Fama ("rumor") was described as having multiple tongues, eyes, ears and feathers by Virgil (in Aeneid IV line 180 and following) and other authors. Virgil wrote that she "had her feet on the ground, and her head in the clouds, making the small seem great and the great seem greater". 
In Homer Pheme is called Rumour the goddess or the messenger of Zeus.

In English Renaissance theatre, Rumour was a stock personification, best known from William Shakespeare's Henry IV, Part 2 in the quote "Open your ears; for which of you will stop The vent of hearing, when loud Rumour speaks?".  James C. Bulman's Arden Shakespeare edition notes numerous lesser known theatrical examples.

Linguistic associations
The Greek word pheme is related to ϕάναι "to speak" and can mean "fame", "report", or "rumor". The Latin word fama, with the same range of meanings, is related to the Latin fari ("to speak"), and is, through French, the etymon of the English "fame".

See also
Polychronion
Iris
Gná

Notes

References 
 Smith, William; Dictionary of Greek and Roman Biography and Mythology, London (1873). "Ossa" 
 Gianni Guastella, "La Fama degli antichi e le sue trasformazioni tra Medioevo e Rinascimento(The fame of the antiquity and its transformations between the Middle Ages and the Renaissance)," in Sergio Audano, Giovanni Cipriani (ed.), Aspetti della Fortuna dell'Antico nella Cultura Europea: atti della settima giornata di studi(Aspects of Ancient Fortune in European Culture: Proceedings of the Seventh Study Day), Sestri Levante, 19 Marzo 2010 (Foggia: Edizioni il Castello, 2011) (Echo, 1), 35–74.

External links

 Theoi Greek Mythology -- Pheme
 

Greek goddesses
Personifications in Greek mythology
Children of Gaia